Li Baojia, courtesy name (zi) Li Boyuan (1867-1906), art name nickname (hao) Nanting tingzhang was a Qing Dynasty-era Chinese author. He was a writer, essayist, ballad author, poet, calligrapher, and seal carver. He edited a fiction periodical and several tabloids.

History
Li Baojia was born in Shandong. His ancestral hometown was Wujin in what is now Changzhou, Jiangsu. Li Baojia lived in Shandong for his early childhood and young adulthood, spanning the years 1867 to 1892. After 1892 he moved to Wujin into the residence of his parents. For a five-year period he studied for the xiucai imperial examination and passed it. He then studied for the juren exam but did not pass. He moved from Wujin to Shanghai at age 30 and worked as a writer and journalist.

Initially Li served as the principal writer and editor of several area tabloids and magazines. By 1903 he became the editor of and a contributor to the Xiuxiang Xiaoshuo, a reputable fortnightly publication that was published by the Commercial Press of Shanghai, then the city's largest publisher.

He died in Shanghai at age 39.

Writing style
The Indiana Companion to Traditional Chinese Literature, Part 1 wrote that in Li Baojia's time, his writings were popular and "suited the social and political climate" of the late Qing Dynasty. Li Baojia wrote novels for an audience who did not receive a classical education, and he used everyday vernacular speech in his works. The Indiana Companion to Traditional Chinese Literature, Part 1 stated that some people characterized his writings as "satirical, vituperative, and exaggerated".

Li Baojia's works are meant to reflect Chinese society. His characters were written to represent social groups so he did not use complex characterization. He patterned each of his novels from an identical plot organized in thematic cycles. He used this plot as a base to systematically describe social strata. Milena Doleželová-Velingerová, author of "Chapter 38: Fiction from the End of the Empire to the Beginning of the Republic (1897-1916)", wrote that "These new inventions in the structural configuration of the novel made Li Pao-chia an unsurpassed master of the late Ch'ing novel while presenting a broad picture of Chinese society."

The Indiana Companion to Traditional Chinese Literature, Part 1 stated that Li Baojia's works were "artistically uneven".

Purpose of his writing
The Indiana Companion to Traditional Chinese Literature, Part 1 argued that Li Baojia's novels "portrayed China in a serious state of disrepair and in need of drastic change" and that his works "served an important political and social function in a critical transitional period." The book further argued that many later readers of Li Baojia's works interpreted them as advocating for radical changes but that Li Baojia himself was a moderate reformer who was against radical change.

Works

Novels:
 Officialdom Unmasked - Li Baojia wrote the book from 1901 to 1906 while simultaneously writing other books. Jaroslav Průšek wrote that Li Baojia wrote Officialdom Unmasked because Li Baojia wanted to entice people into opposing a corrupt bureaucracy. Since the year of Li Baojia's death, the current version of Guanchang Xianxing Ji is a 60 chapter version. Donald Holoch, author of "A Novel of Setting: The Bureaucrats", wrote that a man named Ouyang Juyuan, a friend of Li Baojia, "allegedly" added the final 12 chapters after Li Baojia died, and therefore the 60 chapter version is "commonly held to be the work of two men."
 Wenming Xiaoshi
 English translation: 
 Huo Diyu - It documents judicial and penal system's malpractices. This work was unfinished.

Ballads:
 Gengzi Guobian Tanci  - Written immediately after the Boxer Rebellion, it was Li Baojia's first major literary work, serialized in the Shanghai Shijie Fanhua Bao.

Miscellaneous writings
 Nanting Sihua - A collection of four miscellaneous writings by Li Baojia

The Indiana Companion to Traditional Chinese Literature, Part 1 stated that "There are also a number of works of doubtful authorship attributed to him."
 Haitian Hongxue Ji
 Fanhua Meng
 Zhongguo Xianzai Ji

References
 Doleželová-Velingerová, Milena. "Chapter 38: Fiction from the End of the Empire to the Beginning of the Republic (1897-1916)" in: Mair, Victor H. (editor). The Columbia History of Chinese Literature. Columbia University Press, August 13, 2013. p. 697-731. , 9780231528511.
 Holoch, Donald. "A Novel of Setting: The Bureaucrats" in: Doleželová-Velingerová, Milena (editor). The Chinese Novel at the Turn of the Century (Toronto: University of Toronto Press; January 1, 1980), 9780802054739.
 PL, "Li Pao-chia." In: Nienhauser, William H. (editor). The Indiana Companion to Traditional Chinese Literature, Part 1. Indiana University Press, 1986. , 9780253329837.
 Yang, Xiaobin. The Chinese Postmodern: Trauma and Irony in Chinese Avant-garde Fiction. University of Michigan Press, 2002. , 9780472112418.

Notes

Further reading

 Yang Lam, Mei-Lan. Li Baojia's A Short History of Modern Times. University of Toronto, 1981. See profile at Google Books.

External links
 "李寶嘉 Li Baojia." University of Heidelberg. (Archive)
 

Qing dynasty novelists
1906 deaths
1867 births
Writers from Shandong
19th-century Chinese novelists
Chinese male novelists
Qing dynasty essayists
Poets from Shandong
Qing dynasty calligraphers
Artists from Shandong
Chinese seal artists